Henry Dillon may refer to:

Henry Dillon, 8th Viscount Dillon (??–1714), Irish soldier
Henry Dillon, 11th Viscount Dillon (1705–1787), Irish politician
Henry Dillon, 13th Viscount Dillon (1777–1832), Irish politician